William Salmond Thomson Penman (7 August 1939 – December 2017) was a Scottish footballer, who played for Rangers,  Newcastle United, Swindon Town, Walsall, Dundalk and Seattle Sounders. Penman was a used substitute as Swindon won the Football League Cup in 1968–69.

He later managed for a season at Cheltenham Town in 1973. He then played in the NASL for Seattle Sounders.

Penman died in December 2017.

References

1939 births
2017 deaths
Footballers from Fife
Scottish footballers
Association football inside forwards
Scottish Football League players
English Football League players
Rangers F.C. players
Newcastle United F.C. players
Swindon Town F.C. players
Walsall F.C. players
Dundalk F.C. players
Cheltenham Town F.C. managers
St Andrews United F.C. players
Seattle Sounders (1974–1983) players
Place of death missing
Scottish expatriate footballers
Expatriate soccer players in the United States
North American Soccer League (1968–1984) players
Scottish expatriate sportspeople in the United States
Scottish football managers
Scottish Junior Football Association players